School District 92 Nisga'a is a school district in British Columbia, Canada. Situated in the Nass River valley it covers the First Nations area of the Nisga'a people north of Terrace. This includes the communities of Gitlaxt'aamiks (or New Aiyansh), Gitwinksihlkw (or Canyon City), Laxgalts'ap (or Greenville), Gingolx (or Kincolith), and the surrounding settlements.

History

School District 92 Nisga'a was created January 1, 1975 as the first aboriginal school district in the province. There has been a steady decline in the number of students over the past several years. In 
September 2010, there were 422 students in Grades K-12. School populations range from 46 
students in the smallest elementary school to 241 in the combined elementary/secondary school 
located in the largest community. There are 44 students designated as having special needs, 
within the Ministry of Education categories. Half of our students—212 students—receive 
English Language Development programs and services.

Schools

The School District also operates the Nisga'a ACE School for Adult Continuing Education. The schools are relatively far geographically from each other.

See also
List of school districts in British Columbia

External links
 School District 92 (Nisga'a)

Nisga'a
92